Love Is Hell may refer to:

Love Is Hell, a Life in Hell anthology by cartoonist Matt Groening
Love Is Hell (Kitchens of Distinction album), 1989
Love Is Hell (Ryan Adams album), 2004
Love Is Hell (Phora album), 2018